Federico Bonansea (born 13 March 1998) is an Argentine professional footballer who plays as a goalkeeper for Agropecuario, on loan from Unión Santa Fe.

Career
Bonansea started his youth career in his hometown with Fray Nicasio Gutiérrez, which preceded stints with All Boys de Villa María and Estudiantes de Hernando. In 2010, he joined Belgrano's academy. In July 2016, Bonansea was loaned to Spanish football with Tercera División team Villarreal C. He made his debut on 23 October in a 4–0 home win against Segorbe, which was followed by further appearances against Rayo Ibense, Segorbe (away) and Muro. During his time there, the goalkeeper was an unused substitute thirty-two times. Bonansea returned to Belgrano in July 2017, though would depart two years later.

July 2019 saw Bonansea return to Spain with Moralo. He'd appear just once, playing all of a 9–2 away win versus Valdivia on 9 November 2019. In January 2020, Bonansea returned to his homeland with Primera División side Unión Santa Fe. After being on the bench for a Copa Sudamericana defeat to Emelec in October, he made his competitive Unión debut on 20 November against Arsenal de Sarandí. In January 2022, Bonansea joined Primera Nacional club Agropecuario on a one-year loan deal.

International career
In 2015, Bonansea was called up to represent Argentina at the South American U-17 Championship and FIFA U-17 World Cup; though didn't appear at either tournament. He also trained with the senior squad at the 2015 Copa América.

Career statistics
.

Notes

References

External links

1998 births
Living people
Sportspeople from Córdoba Province, Argentina
Argentine people of Italian descent
Argentine footballers
Association football goalkeepers
Argentine expatriate footballers
Expatriate footballers in Spain
Argentine expatriate sportspeople in Spain
Tercera División players
Argentine Primera División players
Club Atlético Belgrano footballers
Villarreal CF C players
Moralo CP players
Unión de Santa Fe footballers